Banzai Run is a pinball machine produced by Williams in 1988, and the first machine designed by Pat Lawlor. It has a multi-playfield design, in which the player can play a vertical game on the machine's backglass in addition to the main playfield.

Game quotes
 "Be king of the hill -- Race Banzai Run"
 "Welcome racefans!"

Design team
 Concept: Larry DeMar, Pat Lawlor
 Design: Pat Lawlor, Larry DeMar
 Programming: Larry DeMar, Ed Boon
 Game design: Larry DeMar, Pat Lawlor
 Software: Ed Boon
 Artwork: Mark Sprenger
 Mechanics: John Krutsch
 Sound and music: Brian Schmidt

Digital versions
Banzai Run was formerly available as purchasable DLC in The Pinball Arcade until June 30, 2018, when the WMS license expired and had not been renewed. Due to this, the DLC is no longer available for purchase.

External links
 
 Pinball Archive rule sheet
 Internet Pinball Serial Number Database entry

Williams pinball machines
1988 pinball machines